PGA West is a set of 6 golf courses located in La Quinta, California.

The PGA West Stadium Course was designed by Pete Dye and is viewed as the sequel to the TPC at Sawgrass. It was inspired by the Scottish links-style courses and at one point was considered one of Golf Digest's Top 100 Courses in America.

Golf tournaments
The PGA West Stadium Course has hosted many important golf tournaments and is considered one of the most challenging courses in America.

Skins Game – 1986–1991
The American Express, formerly the Desert Classic – 1987, 2016–present
PGA Club Professional Championship – 1990
PGA Tour Qualifying School Finals – 1986, 1988, 1989, 2002, 2006 and 2008
Liberty Mutual Legends of Golf – 1995–1996

Controversy
The PGA West Stadium Course has long been known as the course that was too tough for the professionals. In 1987 it made its first appearance as a PGA Tour venue in the Bob Hope Classic (now known as The American Express). After creating a challenging course setup in what is normally one of the PGA Tour's easier tournaments, the tour pros refused to return in 1988 successfully signing a petition to get it removed as one of the host courses, a ban that effectively ran until 2015;  the course returned to the rotation in 2016.

References

Golf clubs and courses in California
Coachella Valley
Golf clubs and courses designed by Pete Dye
Sports venues in Riverside County, California